|}

The Minstrel Stakes is a Group 2 flat horse race in Ireland open to thoroughbreds aged three years or older. It is run at the Curragh over a distance of 7 furlongs (1,408 metres), and it is scheduled to take place each year in July.

The event is named after The Minstrel, a successful Irish-trained racehorse in the 1970s. It was formerly held at Phoenix Park in late April or early May, and it used to be contested by three-year-olds over a mile. For a period it was classed at Listed level.

The race was transferred to the Curragh and switched to July in 1991, and at this point it was opened to older horses. It was promoted to Group 3 status in 1996, and cut to 7 furlongs in 2001. The minimum age of participating horses was raised to four in 2002, and three-year-olds were re-admitted in 2007. It was upgraded to Group 2 level from the 2016 running.

Records

Most successful horse since 1988 (2 wins):
 Ramooz – 1997, 1999
 Gordon Lord Byron - 2015, 2016
 Romanised - 2019, 2020
 Order of Australia -  2021, 2022 

Leading jockey since 1988 (6 wins):
 Michael Kinane – Executive Perk (1988), Twilight Agenda (1989), Go and Go (1990), Asema (1993), King Charlemagne (2001), Caradak (2005)

Leading trainer since 1988 (7 wins):

 Aidan O'Brien - Wandering Thoughts (1994), King Charlemagne (2001), Air Chief Marshal (2010), Darwin (2013), Spirit Of Valor (2017), Order of Australia (2021,2022)

Winners since 1988

See also
 Horse racing in Ireland
 List of Irish flat horse races

References

 Racing Post:

 galopp-sieger.de – Minstrel Stakes.
 ifhaonline.org – International Federation of Horseracing Authorities – Minstrel Stakes (2019).
 irishracinggreats.com – Minstrel Stakes (Group 3).
 pedigreequery.com – Minstrel Stakes – Curragh.

Flat races in Ireland
Curragh Racecourse
Open mile category horse races